Wang Dongsheng (born 12 May 1997) is a Chinese footballer currently playing as a full-back for Zhejiang Professional.

Club career
In 2017 Wang Dongsheng would be promoted to the senior team of Hangzhou Greentown and would make his debut on 12 March 2017 in a league game against Nei Mongol Zhongyou in a 3-2 victory. The following season he would be loaned out to third tier club Fujian Tianxin to gain more playing time. On his return, he would start to establish himself as a regular member within the team as they renamed themselves Zhejiang Professional. He would then play a vital part as the club gained promotion to the top tier at the end of the 2021 campaign.

Career statistics
.

References

External links
Dongsheng Wang at Worldfootball.net

1997 births
Living people
Chinese footballers
Association football defenders
China League One players
China League Two players
Zhejiang Professional F.C. players